Bhan is an Indian Kashmiri Pandit and Punjabi Saraswat Brahmin surname.

Notable People with surname :
Ashok Bhan (born 1950), retired Indian Police Service officer, Director General of Police Intelligence and Director General of Police Prisons
Gopinath Bhan (1898–1968), also called Bhagwan Gopinath Ji, mystic saint of Kashmir in India
Maharaj Kishan Bhan (1947–2020), Indian Paediatrician and Clinical Scientist
Mona Bhan, cultural anthropologist and associate professor of anthropology at DePauw University
Pushkar Bhan (1926–2008), radio actor and script writer from Kashmir
Shereen Bhan (born 1976), Indian journalist and news anchor

See also
In Scottish Gaelic, the word for white is bàn (also bhàn, bhàin), as in:
An Eala Bhàn ("The White Swan"), a Scottish Gaelic love song composed by Dòmhnall Ruadh Chorùna during the Battle of the Somme
Battle of Coille Bhan (Battle of the White Wood) was fought in 1721 near Attadale, in the county of Ross in the Scottish Highlands
Beinn Bhàn (disambiguation), meaning White Mountain in Gaelic, is a common name, applied to several hills in different parts of Scotland
Beinn Bhan (Applecross), a mountain in the highlands of Scotland, lying on the Applecross peninsula, on the north side of Loch Kishorn
Beinn Bhan (Arkaig), a Scottish mountain situated in the Lochaber region of the Highland Council Area
Binn Bhan, a mountain in County Galway, Ireland, the highest of the Twelve Bens, and the highest peak in Galway
Leine bhan, ("White Shirt"), a distinctive smock which trangressors of ecclesiastical law in Scotland were at one time obliged to wear
Other names including the word Bhan:
Takali Bhan, small village in Shrirampur taluka, Ahmednagar district, Maharashtra, India
Bhan Syedabad, a small town near Dadu, Dadu District, Sindh, Pakistan

Surnames
Indian surnames
Hindu surnames
Kashmiri-language surnames
Kashmiri tribes
Kashmiri Brahmins
Punjabi-language surnames
Punjabi Brahmins
Punjabi tribes